The Storey ministry was the 37th ministry of the New South Wales Government, and was led by the 20th Premier, John Storey.

Storey was elected to the New South Wales Legislative Assembly in 1901, serving until his death while Premier in 1921, with a break between 1904 and 1907 following the abolition of his seat. In November 1916 Labor split over conscription, when Premier William Holman, and twenty of his supporters were expelled from the party for defying party policy and supporting conscription. Holman and his supporters joined a grand coalition with the members of the various conservative parties, which by 1917, this had coalesced into the Nationalist Party of Australia. Storey was elected leader of the Labor party in 1917 and helped to reduce the scale of Labor's defeat in the 1917 election.

Storey led Labor to a resurgent result at the 1920 state election, picking up 10 seats with Storey calling the result "half a mandate". Holman had been defeated for his seat and George Fuller became leader of the Nationalist Party. The assembly was evenly divided, with Labor having 43 seats and the support of Percy Brookfield and Arthur Gardiner (Independent Labor), while the Nationalists had 28 seats and the support of 15 seats of the Progressive Party and 2 independent Nationalists. The Speaker of the Legislative Assembly did not vote unless there was a tie which meant whichever side provided the speaker was unable to command a majority. Nationalist Daniel Levy controversially accepted re-election as speaker, giving Labor an effective majority. Storey died in office on 5 October 1921.

The ministry covers the period from 12 April 1920, until 10 October 1821, when the ministry was dissolved and Storey's deputy, James Dooley, was appointed as Premier. This ministry was the first time in which the role of Premier was a separate ministerial portfolio.

Composition of ministry
The composition of the ministry was announced by Premier Storey on 12 April 1920 and covers the period up to 10 October 1821, five days after Storey's death, when the ministry was dissolved.

 
Ministers are members of the Legislative Assembly unless otherwise noted.

See also

Members of the New South Wales Legislative Assembly, 1920–1922
Members of the New South Wales Legislative Council, 1920–1922

References

 

New South Wales ministries
1920 establishments in Australia
1921 disestablishments in Australia
Australian Labor Party ministries in New South Wales